The Italian general election of 2001 took place on 13 May 2001.

The election was won in Veneto by the centre-right House of Freedoms coalition, which won also nationally, by a landslide. Forza Italia was the most voted party with 31.9%.

Results

Chamber of Deputies

|- bgcolor="#E9E9E9"
!style="background-color:#E9E9E9" align=left rowspan=2 valign=bottom|Coalition
!colspan="3" align="center" valign=top|Single-seat constituencies
!colspan="5" align="center" valign=top|Proportional system
!colspan="1" align="center" valign=top|Total
|-
|- bgcolor="#E9E9E9"
|align="center" valign=top|votes
|align="center" valign=top|votes (%)
|align="center" valign=top|seats
|align="center" valign=top|Party
|align="center" valign=top|votes
|align="center" valign=top|votes (%)
|align="center" valign=top|seats
|align="center" valign=top|tot.
|align="center" valign=top|seats
|-

|-
|rowspan="5" align="left" valign=top|House of Freedoms
|rowspan="5" align="right" valign=top|1,454,877
|rowspan="5" align="right" valign=top|47.3
|rowspan="5" align="right" valign=top|30

|rowspan="1" align="left"|Forza Italia
|align="right"|984,237
|align="right"|31.9
|align="right"|5

|rowspan="5" align="right" valign=top|7
|rowspan="5" align="right" valign=top|37

|-

|rowspan="1" align="left"|Lega Nord
|align="right"|309,809
|align="right"|10.1
|align="right"|-

|-

|rowspan="1" align="left"|National Alliance
|align="right"|260,596
|align="right"|8.5
|align="right"|2

|-

|rowspan="1" align="left"|CCD–CDU
|align="right"|100,582
|align="right"|3.3
|align="right"|-

|-

|rowspan="1" align="left"|New Italian Socialist Party
|align="right"|25,495
|align="right"|0.8
|align="right"|-

|-
|rowspan="4" align="left" valign=top|The Olive Tree
|rowspan="4" align="right" valign=top|1,125,978
|rowspan="4" align="right" valign=top|36.6
|rowspan="4" align="right" valign=top|7

|rowspan="1" align="left"|Democracy is Freedom – The Daisy
|align="right"|448,093
|align="right"|14.5
|align="right"|3

|rowspan="4" align="right" valign=top|5
|rowspan="4" align="right" valign=top|12

|-

|rowspan="1" align="left"|Democrats of the Left
|align="right"|328,734
|align="right"|10.7
|align="right"|2

|-

|rowspan="1" align="left"|Greens–Socialists
|align="right"|81,328
|align="right"|2.6
|align="right"|-

|-

|rowspan="1" align="left"|Party of Italian Communists
|align="right"|33,261
|align="right"|1.1
|align="right"|-

|-
|rowspan="1" align="left"|Liga Fronte Veneto
|rowspan="1" align="right"|173,479
|rowspan="1" align="right"|5.6
|rowspan="1" align="right"|-

|rowspan="1" align="left"|Liga Fronte Veneto
|align="right"|73,283
|align="right"|2.4
|align="right"|-

|rowspan="1" align="right"|-
|rowspan="1" align="right"|-

|-
|rowspan="1" align="left"|Italy of Values
|rowspan="1" align="right"|143,476
|rowspan="1" align="right"|4.7
|rowspan="1" align="right"|-

|rowspan="1" align="left"|Italy of Values
|align="right"|142,834
|align="right"|4.6
|align="right"|-

|rowspan="1" align="right"|-
|rowspan="1" align="right"|-

|-
|rowspan="1" align="left"|Communist Refoundation Party
|rowspan="1" align="right"|-
|rowspan="1" align="right"|-
|rowspan="1" align="right"|-

|rowspan="1" align="left"|Communist Refoundation Party
|align="right"|119,251
|align="right"|3.9
|align="right"|1

|rowspan="1" align="right"|1
|rowspan="1" align="right"|1

|-
|rowspan="1" align="left"|European Democracy
|rowspan="1" align="right"|104,904
|rowspan="1" align="right"|3.4
|rowspan="1" align="right"|-

|rowspan="1" align="left"|European Democracy
|align="right"|56,640
|align="right"|1.8
|align="right"|-

|rowspan="1" align="right"|-
|rowspan="1" align="right"|-

|-
|rowspan="1" align="left"|Bonino List
|rowspan="1" align="right"|38,009
|rowspan="1" align="right"|1.2
|rowspan="1" align="right"|-

|rowspan="1" align="left"|Bonino List
|align="right"|91,963
|align="right"|3.0
|align="right"|-

|rowspan="1" align="right"|-
|rowspan="1" align="right"|-

|-
|rowspan="1" align="left"|Others
|rowspan="1" align="right"|37,707
|rowspan="1" align="right"|1.2
|rowspan="1" align="right"|-

|rowspan="1" align="left"|others
|align="right"|25,998
|align="right"|0.9
|align="right"|-

|rowspan="1" align="right"|-
|rowspan="1" align="right"|-

|-
|- bgcolor="#E9E9E9"
!rowspan="1" align="left" valign="top"|Total coalitions
!rowspan="1" align="right" valign="top"|3,077,333
!rowspan="1" align="right" valign="top"|100.0
!rowspan="1" align="right" valign="top"|37
!rowspan="1" align="left" valign="top"|Total parties
!rowspan="1" align="right" valign="top"|3,073,699
!rowspan="1" align="right" valign="top"|100.0
!rowspan="1" align="right" valign="top"|13
!rowspan="1" align="right" valign="top"|13
!rowspan="1" align="right" valign="top"|50
|}
Sources: Regional Council of Veneto and Ministry of the Interior

Senate

|- bgcolor="#E9E9E9"
!style="background-color:#E9E9E9" align=left rowspan=2 valign=bottom|Coalition
!colspan="3" align="center" valign=top|Single-seat constituencies
!colspan="1" align="center" valign=top|PR
!colspan="1" align="center" valign=top|Total
|-
|- bgcolor="#E9E9E9"
|align="center" valign=top|votes
|align="center" valign=top|votes (%)
|align="center" valign=top|seats
|align="center" valign=top|seats
|align="center" valign=top|seats
|-
|rowspan="1" align="left" valign=top|House of Freedoms
|rowspan="1" align="right" valign=top|1,257,799
|rowspan="1" align="right" valign=top|44.8
|rowspan="1" align="right" valign=top|16
|rowspan="1" align="right" valign=top|-
|rowspan="1" align="right" valign=top|16
|-
|rowspan="1" align="left" valign=top|The Olive Tree
|rowspan="1" align="right" valign=top|950,455
|rowspan="1" align="right" valign=top|33.8
|rowspan="1" align="right" valign=top|1
|rowspan="1" align="right" valign=top|6
|rowspan="1" align="right" valign=top|7
|-
|rowspan="1" align="left"|Liga Fronte Veneto
|rowspan="1" align="right" valign=top|137,363
|rowspan="1" align="right" valign=top|4.9
|rowspan="1" align="right" valign=top|-
|rowspan="1" align="right" valign=top|-
|rowspan="1" align="right" valign=top|-
|-
|rowspan="1" align="left"|Italy of Values
|rowspan="1" align="right" valign=top|112,336
|rowspan="1" align="right" valign=top|4.0
|rowspan="1" align="right" valign=top|-
|rowspan="1" align="right" valign=top|-
|rowspan="1" align="right" valign=top|-
|-
|rowspan="1" align="left"|Communist Refoundation Party
|rowspan="1" align="right" valign=top|109,135
|rowspan="1" align="right" valign=top|3.9
|rowspan="1" align="right" valign=top|-
|rowspan="1" align="right" valign=top|-
|rowspan="1" align="right" valign=top|-
|-
|rowspan="1" align="left"|European Democracy
|rowspan="1" align="right" valign=top|88,783
|rowspan="1" align="right" valign=top|3.2
|rowspan="1" align="right" valign=top|-
|rowspan="1" align="right" valign=top|-
|rowspan="1" align="right" valign=top|-
|-
|rowspan="1" align="left"|Bonino List
|rowspan="1" align="right" valign=top|64,334
|rowspan="1" align="right" valign=top|2.3
|rowspan="1" align="right" valign=top|-
|rowspan="1" align="right" valign=top|-
|rowspan="1" align="right" valign=top|-
|-
|rowspan="1" align="left"|Va' pensiero Padania – Veneto
|rowspan="1" align="right" valign=top|45,584
|rowspan="1" align="right" valign=top|1.6
|rowspan="1" align="right" valign=top|-
|rowspan="1" align="right" valign=top|-
|rowspan="1" align="right" valign=top|-
|-
|rowspan="1" align="left"|Tricolour Flame
|rowspan="1" align="right" valign=top|42,408
|rowspan="1" align="right" valign=top|1.5
|rowspan="1" align="right" valign=top|-
|rowspan="1" align="right" valign=top|-
|rowspan="1" align="right" valign=top|-
|-
|rowspan="1" align="left"|Others
|rowspan="1" align="right" valign=top|1,058
|rowspan="1" align="right" valign=top|0.0
|rowspan="1" align="right" valign=top|-
|rowspan="1" align="right" valign=top|-
|rowspan="1" align="right" valign=top|-
|-
|- bgcolor="#E9E9E9"
!rowspan="1" align="left" valign="top"|Total coalitions
!rowspan="1" align="right" valign="top"|2,821,258
!rowspan="1" align="right" valign="top"|100.0
!rowspan="1" align="right" valign="top"|17
!rowspan="1" align="right" valign="top"|6
!rowspan="1" align="right" valign="top"|23
|}
Sources: Regional Council of Veneto and Ministry of the Interior

Elections in Veneto
General, Veneto
May 2001 events in Europe